Gerdeh Qit (also Romanized as Gerdeh Qīţ and Gerdeh Qīt) is a village in Almahdi Rural District, Mohammadyar District, Naqadeh County, West Azerbaijan Province, Iran. At the 2006 census, its population was 752, in 119 families.

References 

Populated places in Naqadeh County